Unihan is an effort by Unicode/ISO 10646 to map Han characters into a single set, ignoring regional variations.

Unihan may also refer to:
 Unihan Database, a web data file maintained by the Unicode Consortium
 UniHan IME, an input method based on the IIIMF framework
 Unihan font, a Unicode font developed by Ross Paterson in 1993
 UNIHAN, Leibniz University Hannover
 Unihan Corporation, Taiwanese contract manufacturer (but an old name for Pegatron)